The 1960 NCAA Tennis Championships were the 15th annual NCAA-sponsored tournaments to determine the national champions of men's singles, doubles, and team collegiate tennis in the United States.

UCLA captured the team championship, the Bruins' sixth such title. UCLA finished eight points ahead of rivals USC in the final team standings (18–8). Either UCLA or USC would ultimately win the men's team title during each of the subsequent twelve seasons (1960-1971).

Host site
This year's tournaments were contested at the University of Washington in Seattle, Washington.

Team scoring
Until 1977, the men's team championship was determined by points awarded based on individual performances in the singles and doubles events.

References

External links
List of NCAA Men's Tennis Champions

NCAA Division I tennis championships
NCAA Division I Tennis Championships
NCAA Division I Tennis Championships
NCAA Tennis Championships